Marsdenia mackeeorum is a species of vine in the family Apocynaceae. It is endemic to New Caledonia.

Description
Marsdenia mackeeorum is a slender twining vine growing to 3 m. It has white latex.

Vegetatively, this species differs little from M. microstoma, but is distinguished from it by its bostrychoid inflorescence on a rachis which continues to grow and flower, whereas M. microstoma has a different inflorescence type and all the flowers on it open at the same time.

Conservation status

Etymology
The specific epithet, mackeeorum, honours Hugh Shaw MacKee and his wife, Margaret.

References

External links
Marsdenia mackeeorum Meve, Gâteblé & Liede, endemia.nc Flore et Faune de Nouvelle-Calédonie.
Marsdenia mackeeorum GBIF Images of specimens, map

mackeeorum
Flora of New Caledonia
Plants described in 2017
Taxa named by Gildas Gâteblé
Taxa named by Ulrich Meve
Taxa named by Sigrid Liede-Schumann